Vadim Aleksandrovich Nemkov (born 20 June 1992) is a Russian professional mixed martial artist and a four-time Combat Sambo World Champion. He currently competes in the Light Heavyweight division of Bellator, where he is the current Bellator Light Heavyweight Champion. As of May 10, 2022, he was #2 in the Bellator men's pound-for-pound rankings. Nemkov is the younger brother of Viktor Nemkov and is a protégé of the MMA Heavyweight and Sambo master Fedor Emelianenko. He is currently ranked as the #1 Light Heavyweight in the world by Sherdog.com.

Background 
Vadim was born on June 20, 1992. Many sources contain information that he is a native of Belgorod, but this is not at all the case. His family began their life journey in a small village in Kazakhstan, where they lived until 1999, after which he, his brother Viktor and his parents moved to the village of Tomarovka, Belgorod Region. It was here that Nemkov's sports path began.

In all endeavors, Vadim followed his older brother Viktor. At the Tamarov school, they began to attend the judo section, then hand-to-hand combat attracted their attention, and only after that it was the turn of sambo, where both brothers reached great heights and received a good sports base. During the period of study at the school, Nemkov managed to participate in many competitions in sambo and other disciplines. Almost all of his youth was spent at a high pace, learning, discovering new things in sports.

At the time of graduation, Vadim was drafted into the army. He himself admits that there was an opportunity not to go there, but there was not even a thought about it. Due to the fact that the guy himself was strong and well physically developed, he was called up for service in the special forces. Nemkov notes that the army gave him additional knowledge, both in the sports component and in life in general. The hardening he received there helps him to enter the cage against any opponent without any fear.

At the moment, Vadim has 2 educations. He received the first at the Technological University of Belgorod, having received a diploma in the specialty "Personnel Management", and the second, already in 2017, at BelSU, with a degree in "Coach".

During this entire period of time "army-training", Nemkov actively participated in the Russian, European and world championships in combat sambo, where in most cases he took gold. Between 2014 and 2019, he took the gold 4 times at the World Sambo Championships 100 kg class, and after that he said that he would not waste his time on such competitions in the future and would devote himself entirely to MMA.

Mixed martial arts career

Early career
As part of mixed martial arts, Nemkov made his debut on May 31, 2013. The technical knockout that knocked out Magomed Datsiev brought victory to Vadim. Less than a month later, on June 27, he also defeated Andrei Trufaikin by TKO. The next were the Pole Michal Gutovskiy (10-3 at the time of the fight) and the Romanian Isidor Bunea, who generally appeared in professional MMA for the first and last time - they lost in the first round. As a result, having gained a series of 4 early victories, already in 2015 Vadim was signed to Rizin.

Rizin Fighting Federation

Rizin Fighting World Grand Prix 2015
In November 2015, the Japanese fight promotion – and successor to Pride Fighting Championships – Rizin Fighting Federation announced the brackets for a Heavyweight Grand Prix to be held on December 29 and 31. It was announced Nemkov would make his Rizin debut against Goran Reljic. He won the bout by knockout in the first round, advancing to the semi-finals 2 days later. In the semi-finals on December 31, Nemkov faced Jiří Procházka, losing via retirement due to being too exhausted at the end of the first (10 minute) round.

Rizin 1
Nemkov returned to face Karl Albrektsson on April 16, 2016, at Rizin 1. He lost the fight via split decision.

Rizin Fighting Word Grand Prix 2016: Second Round
After a fight in Russia for Fight Nights Global, Nemkov again competed in Rizin against Alison Vicente on December 29, 2016, at RIZIN FF WGP 2nd round. He won the fight via TKO in the first round.

Fight Nights Global

Fight Nights Global 50: Emelianenko vs Maldonado
On June 17, 2016, Nemkov fought Mikołaj Różanski on the Fight Nights Global 50: Emelianenko vs Maldonado card in St. Petersburg, Russia. He won the fight via TKO in the first round.

Bellator MMA
On August 25, 2017, Nemkov made his Bellator debut against Philipe Lins at Bellator 182. He won the fight by knockout in the first round.

In his second bout for the promotion, Nemkov faced former Bellator Light Heavyweight champion Liam McGeary at Bellator 194 on February 16, 2017. He won the fight via TKO due to leg kicks in the third round.

Nemkov faced another former Bellator Light Heavyweight champion in Phil Davis on November 15, 2018, at Bellator 209. He won the closely contested bout via split decision.

In the beginning of 2019, Nemkov signed a new, multi-fight contract with Bellator MMA. As the first fight of the contract, Nemkov faced former Bellator middleweight champion Rafael Carvalho at Bellator 230 on October 12, 2019. Nemkov won the bout via submission in the second round.

Bellator Light Heavyweight World Champion (2020-present)
After racking up four straight wins in Bellator, three of which against former Bellator titleholders, Nemkov was signed to challenge Ryan Bader at Bellator 242 on May 9, 2020, for the Bellator Light Heavyweight World Championship. However, it was later announced that Bellator 242 and Nemkov's bout against Bader was being postponed due to the COVID-19 pandemic. The bout with Bader was rescheduled and took place on August 21 at Bellator 244. Nemkov won the bout via second-round technical knockout to capture the Bellator Light Heavyweight title.

On February 9, 2021, it was announced that Nemkov would be defending the Bellator Light Heavyweight title in the Bellator Light Heavyweight World Grand Prix Tournament. It was announced that Nemkov would make his first title defense against Phil Davis, a rematch of their November 2018 bout, which saw Nemkov win via split decision. The bout took place at Bellator 257 on April 16, 2021. Nemkov won the bout via unanimous decision, with Nemkov controlling the first three rounds on the feet.

In the semi-finals of the Grand Prix, Nemkov was scheduled to face Anthony Johnson on October 16, 2021, at Bellator 268. On September 18, it was announced that Johnson was pulled from the Grand Prix due to an undisclosed illness and he was replaced by Julius Anglickas. Nemkov dominated the fight with wrestling and ground and pound, eventually winning via submission in round four.

In the finals of the Bellator Light Heavyweight World Grand Prix Tournament, Nemkov took on Corey Anderson for the 205-pound title as well as the $1 million prize on April 15, 2022, at Bellator 277. The fight ended in a no contest after an accidental clash of heads resulted in a cut on Nemkov's left brow that rendered him unable to continue.

The rematch of the finals took place on November 18, 2022, at Bellator 288. Nemkov was able to stop all the takedowns of Anderson, going 16 for 16, and picked Anderson apart from distance on the way to defending his belt and winning the $1 million prize for winning the Grand Prix via unanimous decision.

Nemkov was scheduled to defend his title against Yoel Romero on February 4, 2023, at Bellator 290. However, Nemkov was forced to withdraw due to undisclosed reason and the bout was scrapped.

In January 2023, Bellator announced that it had signed a multi-year, multi-fight contract with Nemkov.

Personal life
Nemkov served in the 16th Spetsnaz Brigade in 2010.

Since 2015, he has been married to a woman named Yekaterina Nemkova. Together they have one daughter.

Championships and accomplishments
Bellator MMA
Bellator Light Heavyweight World Championship (One time; current)
Three successful title defenses
Most consecutive Light Heavyweight title defenses in Bellator MMA history (3)
2021 Bellator Light Heavyweight World Grand Prix winner
Rizin Fighting Federation
2015 Rizin Heavyweight Grand Prix Semifinalist

Mixed martial arts record

|-
|Win
|align=center|16–2 (1)
|Corey Anderson
|Decision (unanimous)
|Bellator 288
|
|align=center|5
|align=center|5:00
|Chicago, Illinois, United States
|
|-
|NC
|align=center|15–2 (1)
|Corey Anderson
|No Contest (accidental clash of heads)
|Bellator 277
|
|align=center|3
|align=center|4:55
|San Jose, California, United States
|
|-
|Win
|align=center|15–2
|Julius Anglickas
|Submission (kimura)
|Bellator 268 
|
|align=center|4
|align=center|4:25
|Phoenix, Arizona, United States 
|
|-
|Win
|align=center|14–2
|Phil Davis
|Decision (unanimous)
|Bellator 257 
|
|align=center|5
|align=center|5:00
|Uncasville, Connecticut, United States 
|
|-
|Win
|align=center| 13–2
|Ryan Bader
|TKO (head kick and punches)
|Bellator 244 
|
|align=center|2
|align=center|3:02
|Uncasville, Connecticut, United States 
|
|-
| Win
| align=center| 12–2
| Rafael Carvalho
|Submission (rear-naked choke)
| Bellator 230
| 
| align=center| 2
| align=center| 3:56
| Milan, Italy
| 
|-
| Win
| style="text-align:center;" | 11–2
|Phil Davis
|Decision (split)
|Bellator 209
|
|style="text-align:center;" | 3
|style="text-align:center;" | 5:00
|Tel Aviv, Israel
|
|-
|Win
|align=center| 10–2 
|Liam McGeary
|TKO (leg kicks)
|Bellator 194
|
|align=center|3
|align=center|4:02
|Uncasville, Connecticut, United States
|
|-
| Win
| align=center| 9–2
| Philipe Lins
| KO (punches)
|Bellator 182
| 
| align=center| 1
| align=center| 3:03
| Verona, New York, United States
|
|-
| Win
| align=center| 8–2
| Alison Vicente 
| TKO (punches)
| RIZIN FF WGP 2nd Round
| 
| align=center| 1
| align=center| 0:55
| Saitama, Japan
|
|-
| Win
| align=center| 7–2
| Mikołaj Różanski
| TKO (punches)
| Fight Nights Global 50: Emelianenko vs Maldonado
| 
| align=center| 1
| align=center| 3:39
| St. Petersburg, Russia
|
|-
| Loss
| align=center| 6–2
| Karl Albrektsson
| Decision (split)
| RIZIN FF 1
| 
| align=center| 3
| align=center| 5:00 
|Nagoya, Aichi, Japan
| 
|-
| Loss
| align=center| 6–1
| Jiří Procházka
| TKO (retirement)
| RIZIN WGP Part 2: Iza
| 
| align=center| 1
| align=center| 10:00
| Saitama, Japan
|
|-
| Win
| align=center| 6–0
| Goran Reljić
| TKO (punches)
| RIZIN WGP Part 1: Saraba
| 
| align=center| 1
| align=center| 2:58
| Saitama, Japan
| 
|-
| Win
| align=center| 5–0
| Joaquim Ferreira
| KO (punch)
| Plotforma S-70 6th
| 
| align=center| 1
| align=center| 0:22
| Sochi, Russia
|
|-
| Win
| align=center| 4–0
| Isidor Bunea
| TKO (submission to punches)
| SOMMAF: Steel Battle 2
| 
| align=center| 1
| align=center| 1:00
| Stary Oskol, Belgorod Oblast, Russia
|
|-
| Win
| align=center| 3–0
| Michał Gutowski
| TKO (punches)
| Alexander Nevsky MMA: Liberation
| 
| align=center| 1
| align=center| 4:32
| Stary Oskol, Belgorod Oblast, Russia
|
|-
| Win
| align=center| 2–0
| Andrei Trufaikin
| TKO (punches)
| RadMer 4: 2 Round
| 
| align=center| 1
| align=center| 2:29
| Sterlitamak, Bashkortostan, Russia
|
|-
|-
| Win
| align=center| 1–0
| Magomed Datsiev
| TKO (ground and pound)
| Way Of The Warrior 3
| 
| align=center| N/A
| align=center| N/A
| Tambov, Russia
|
|-

See also
 List of current Bellator fighters
 List of male mixed martial artists

References

External links
 
 

Living people
1992 births
Light heavyweight mixed martial artists
Russian sambo practitioners
Russian male mixed martial artists
Bellator male fighters
Mixed martial artists utilizing sambo
Mixed martial artists utilizing judo
People from Belgorod
Sportspeople from Belgorod Oblast